Vavla is a small village in Larnaca District, Cyprus. Its population in 2011 was 52.

References

Communities in Larnaca District